The Livin’ Like Hippies Tour is the eighth headlining concert tour by American country music artist Miranda Lambert. It began on January 18, 2018, in Greenville, South Carolina and ended on June 17, 2018, in Grand Junction, Colorado. It is Lambert’s second tour in support of her sixth studio album The Weight of These Wings (2016) following the Highway Vagabond Tour.

Background and show
The tour was announced in September 2017, and the tour name “Livin’ Like Hippies” are lyrics from the track, “Highway Vagabond”.

Lambert opens the show with "That's The Way That The World Goes 'Round" and "Kerosene". After singing past hits and album tracks she ends with "Little Red Wagon".

Critical reception
Timothy Finn of The Kansas City Star writes, "Miranda Lambert shows Sprint Center crowd why country music needs more women stars." Also "But Lambert’s more effective songs are those in which she is at her most vulnerable, in which she admits to her deficiencies and bares her faults, and she sang several of those."

Maggie Jones of Knoxville News Sentinel described the Knoxville show as Lambert "...showcased sass, vulnerability and most of all, relatability, as she sang about her quirks, flaws and passions, and how she's accepted them."

Opening acts

Brent Cobb 
Ashley McBryde
Jon Pardi
Lucie Silvas 
The Steel Woods 
Sunny Sweeney
Turnpike Troubadours 
Charlie Worsham

Setlist
"That's The Way That The World Goes 'Round"
"Kerosene"
"Highway Vagabond"
"We Should Be Friends"
”Vice"
”Heart Like Mine"
”Bathroom Sink"
"Over You"
"All Kinds of Kinds"
"The House That Built Me"
"Gunpowder & Lead"
"Ugly Lights
"Mama's Broken Heart"
"Old Sh!t" 
"Tin Man"
"Airstream Song"
"Pink Sunglasses"
"Rocky Mountain Way" 
"Automatic"
"White Liar"
Encore
"Little Red Wagon"

Tour dates

Box office score

References

Miranda Lambert concert tours
2018 concert tours